Phaegoptera sestia is a moth of the family Erebidae. It was described by Herbert Druce in 1906. It is found in Peru.

References

Phaegoptera
Moths described in 1906
Arctiinae of South America